Celta Vigo contested La Liga and the Copa del Rey in the 1992–93 season. This was their first season back in La Liga after two years away, having been promoted as 1991–92 Segunda División champions. They placed a credible 11th, their best top flight result since 1988–89. They matched their Copa del Rey result from the previous year, being eliminated by Segunda División B side Benidorm in the third round.

Squad

Squad stats 
Last updated on 2 March 2021.

|}

Results

La Liga

League table

Matches

Copa del Rey

Third round 

Benidorm won 4–3 on aggregate

References

External links 
Spain 1992/93 at RSSSF

RC Celta de Vigo seasons
Celta